José Carlos Xavier is a Portuguese operatic tenor.

Biography
A scholarship of the Calouste Gulbenkian Foundation, he graduated cum laude from the Liceo Musicale "G. B. Viotti", in Vercelli, Italy, where he took up residence.

Career
Xavier made his debut at the São Carlos National Theatre,
Portugal, interpreting roles in the operas Miguel Manara, Der Rosenkavalier, Louise, Dona Mécia, Rigoletto, and Fedora.  Abroad, he played Ernesto in Don Pasquale, Dorvil in La Scala di Seta, Peppe in Pagliacci, Beppe in Rita, Des Grieux in Manon, Werther in Werther, Testo in Combatimenti di Tancredi e Clorinda, and Tamino in Die Zauberflöte.

He has performed at renowned music festivals, including Aix-en-Provence, Toulon, Kriens (Lucerne), Vilar de Mouros, Macau.
An interpreter of lied and oratory music, he has performed recitals in several countries.

He commercially recorded for record label Decca (Valentim de Carvalho) and for the
Basic Record Collection of the Secretary of State for Culture.
He recorded recitals for RTP, TVE, and RDP- Radiodiffusion Française.

A lecturer in singing at the Lisbon National Conservatory of Music, he has
supervised some of the most prominent Portuguese young lyrical singers.

He is the founder of the "Luisa Todi National Singing Competition" (eight editions) and
has taught master's degree course in Portugal and abroad.
He is a member of the panel at national and international competitions, such as
the "Bidú Sayao International Singing Competition", the "Rio de Janeiro Municipal
Theatre Singing Competition" in Brazil and also "The International Voice Competition City Of Trujillo" in Peru.

External links
 Portuguese music and musicians
  Crédito theatro-municipal-do-rio-de-janeiro
 Moreau, Mário (1999). O teatro de S. Carlos : dois séculos de história. Lisbon: Hugincop. 1999
 
 Concurso Internacional de Canto Lírico

Notes

Living people
Portuguese operatic tenors
Year of birth missing (living people)